The 1981 Polish Speedway season was the 1981 season of motorcycle speedway in Poland.

Individual

Polish Individual Speedway Championship
The 1981 Individual Speedway Polish Championship final was held on 22 July at Leszno.

Golden Helmet
The 1981 Golden Golden Helmet organised by the Polish Motor Union (PZM) was the 1981 event for the league's leading riders. It was held over 4 rounds.

Final standings (top 11)

Junior Championship
 winner - Stanisław Pogorzelski

Silver Helmet
 winner - Mirosław Berliński

Bronze Helmet
 winner - Mirosław Berliński

Pairs

Polish Pairs Speedway Championship
The 1981 Polish Pairs Speedway Championship was the 1981 edition of the Polish Pairs Speedway Championship. The final was held on 3 June at Toruń.

Team

Team Speedway Polish Championship
The 1981 Team Speedway Polish Championship was the 1981 edition of the Team Polish Championship. 

Falubaz Zielona Góra won the gold medal. The team included Andrzej Huszcza, Henryk Olszak and Maciej Jaworek.

First League

Second League

References

Poland Individual
Poland Team
Speedway